Going to Tehran: Why the United States Must Come to Terms with the Islamic Republic is a book by Flynt Leverett, former senior fellow at the New America Foundation in Washington, D.C., and his wife Hillary Mann Leverett. It was first published in 2013. The premise of Going to Tehran is that the United States must develop its relationship with Iran in a similar manner to that of its relationship with China in the early 1970s at the time of Nixon and Kissinger.

Authors

Flynt Leverett (born March 6, 1958, in Memphis, Tennessee) is a former senior fellow at the New America Foundation in Washington, D.C. and a professor at the Pennsylvania State University School of International Affairs. His wife Hillary Mann Leverett is a visiting scholar at Georgetown University and Peking University, and a senior fellow at the Chongyang Institute for Financial Studies at Renmin University of China. Both authors are former American national security officials.

Context 
Going to Tehran is based on an analysis of  the "Grand strategy of Iran" and the role of negotiating with the United States. According to expert opinion in Washington, Iran's nuclear program had to achieve the same situation that existed in Japan, Canada and other threshold nuclear states; there is the capability of reaching nuclear capability but Iran is not allowed.

Reviews 
According to The New York Times, the authors of Going to Tehran take an obviously partisan stance, accepting the perspective of the Iranian government with regard to both foreign affairs and internal policy. According to the concluding pages, the issues between Iran and America cannot be resolved by isolating, strangling, bombarding, dislodging or waiting for Iran to fall. The American government must consider the Islamic Republic of Iran a strategic partner and both countries have to reach an agreement on controversial issues.  At the end of the book, the author state by example how political planes create a negative view of Iran.

Danny Postel, reviewing the book in The Cairo Review of Global Affairs, wrote, "[T]he Leveretts get it badly wrong when they go out of their way and expend considerable effort not only to portray the Islamic Republic in the most flattering terms, but to disparage Iranian dissidents and trash the democratic Green Movement." 

Roger Cohen, reviewing the book in The New York Review of Books, wrote, "To say the Leveretts are contrarians would be a gross understatement. The brutal crackdown on millions of protesters who took to the streets after the 2009 presidential election was, they argue, 'relatively restrained' — despite the beatings, killings, mass arrests, and institutionalized sodomy that characterized it."

The basic idea of Going to Tehran is that the United States must develop its relationship with Iran in the same manner it did with the People's Republic of China in the early 1970s at the time of Nixon and Kissinger.

Due to the ideas of the authors, the United States is required to come to an agreement with the Islamic Republic, not to safeguarding the interests of Iran but to stabilize its strategic position in the Middle East and to avoid conflict.

See also
 Manufactured Crisis: The Untold Story of the Iran Nuclear Scare

References

External links 
 Going to Tehran website
 How The U.S. Can Come To Terms With Iran (Video)

2013 non-fiction books
American political books
Picador (imprint) books